Reginald Pearce (20 April 1918 – 19 June 1995) was an Australian cricketer. He played three first-class matches for New South Wales in 1952/53.

See also
 List of New South Wales representative cricketers

References

External links
 

1918 births
1995 deaths
Australian cricketers
New South Wales cricketers